Conner Tudsbury (born 3 March 2000) is an English amateur boxer who won bronze medals at the 2018 Youth World Championships and 2018 European Youth Championships.

References

2000 births
English male boxers
Boxers from Manchester
Middleweight boxers
Living people